{{Infobox football club season
| club          = Galatasaray
| season        = 2012–13
| manager       = Fatih Terim
| mgrtitle      = Head coach
| chairman      = Ünal Aysal
| chrtitle      = President
| stadium       = Türk Telekom Arena
| league        = Süper Lig
| league result = 1st
| cup1          = Turkish Cup
| cup1 result   = Fifth round
| cup2          = Turkish Super Cup
| cup2 result   = Winners
| cup3          = UEFA Champions League
| cup3 result   = Quarter-finals
| league topscorer   = Burak Yılmaz (24)
| season topscorer   = Burak Yılmaz (32)
| highest attendance = 52,044 vs Real Madrid(Champions League, 9 April 2013)
| lowest attendance  = 5,500 vs Balıkesirspor(Turkish Cup, 28 November 2012)
| average attendance = 43,262
| pattern_la1 = _Gala2012 2013
| pattern_b1  = _Galatasaray12 13
| pattern_ra1 = _Gala2012 2013
| pattern_sh1 = 
| pattern_so1 = _Galatasarayhome2012 2013
| leftarm1    = 
| body1       = 
| rightarm1   = 
| shorts1     = 
| socks1      = A32638
| pattern_la2 = _gal1213a
| pattern_b2  = _gal1213a
| pattern_ra2 = _gal1213a
| pattern_sh2 = _gal1213a
| pattern_so2 = _Galatasarayaway2012 2013
| leftarm2    = FFFFFF
| body2       = FFFFFF
| rightarm2   = FFFFFF
| shorts2     = FFFFFF
| socks2      = FFFFFF
| pattern_la3 = _gs1213t
| pattern_b3  = _gs1213t
| pattern_ra3 = _gs1213t
| pattern_sh3 = _monterrey1213t1
| pattern_so3 = _monterrey1213t1
| leftarm3    = BB0000
| body3       = 000000
| rightarm3   = 000000
| shorts3     = 000000
| socks3      = 000000
| prevseason = 2011–12
| nextseason = 2013–14}}

The 2012–13 season was Galatasarays 109th in existence and 55th consecutive season in the Süper Lig. This article shows statistics of the club's players in the season, and also lists all matches that the club played in during the season.

Club

Board of Directors

Technical staff

Medical staff

Grounds

Kit
Uniform Manufacturer: Nike

Chest Advertising's: Türk Telekom

Back Advertising's: Ülker

Arm Advertising's: Avea

Short Advertising's: Nikon

Sponsorship
Companies that Galatasaray S.K. had sponsorship deals with during the season included the following.

Season overview
Ayhan Akman retired from his professional football career on 13 May 2012, at the age of 35, after winning his fourth and final Süper Lig title with Galatasaray in the previous season. Additionally, the club did not seek to extend the contracts of some players, including Servet Çetin and Aykut Erçetin, and they therefore became free agents.

Galatasaray began the season by commencing their Süper Lig campaign on 4 July 2012, in which they were aiming for a nineteenth league title. Between 6 and 15 July, Galatasaray preceded the rest of their 2012–13 campaign with an Austrian tour. The tour began with matches against two Austrian teams.

Players

Squad information

 

 

Transfers

In

Total spending:  €30.050 million

Out

Total income:  €3.625 million

Expenditure:  €26.375 million

Competitions

Overall

Pre-season and friendlies

Turkish Super Cup
 

Süper Lig

League table

Results summary

Results by round

Matches

Turkish Cup

UEFA Champions League

Group stage

Knockout phase

Round of 16

Quarter-finals

Statistics

Squad statistics

Statistics accurate as of 18 May 2013

Goals
Includes all competitive matches.Last updated on 18 May 2013Assists
Includes all competitive matches.Last updated on 18 May 2013''

Disciplinary record

Overall

Attendance

 Sold season tickets: 47,200

See also
2012 Turkish Super Cup
2012–13 Süper Lig
2012–13 Turkish Cup
2012–13 UEFA Champions League

References

External links
Galatasaray Sports Club Official Website 
Turkish Football Federation – Galatasaray A.Ş. 
uefa.com – Galatasaray AŞ

2012-13
Turkish football clubs 2012–13 season
2012–13 UEFA Champions League participants seasons
2012-13
2012 in Istanbul
2013 in Istanbul
Galatasaray Sports Club 2012–13 season